Olivi is an Italian surname. People with the surname include:

Megan Olivi (born 1986), American mixed martial arts reporter
Giuseppe Olivi (1769–1795), Italian naturalist
Peter John Olivi (1248–1298), Franciscan theologian
Mauro Olivi (born 1983), Argentinian footballer
Samuele Olivi (born 1980), Italian footballer
Luigi Olivi (1894–1917), Italian World War I flying ace

Italian-language surnames